Matthias Fuchs (1939–2001) was a German stage, film and television actor.

Partial filmography

 The Immenhof Girls (1955) - Ethelbert
 The First Day of Spring (1956) - Martin
 Hochzeit auf Immenhof (1956) - Ethelbert
 Der Meineidbauer (1956) - der junge Franz Ferner (uncredited)
 Ferien auf Immenhof (1957) - Ethelbert
 U 47 – Kapitänleutnant Prien (1958) - Jörg
 The Angel Who Pawned Her Harp (1959) - Klaas Henning
 Two Times Adam, One Time Eve (1959) - Peter
 The Buddenbrooks (1959) - Leutnant von Trotha
 Beloved Augustin (1960) - Augustin Sumser
  (1960) - Horst
 Das Mädchen und der Staatsanwalt (1962) - Berndt
  (1962) - Ein Hotelboy
 The Cardinal (1963) - Father Neidermoser
 The Last Days of Gomorrah (1974, TV film) - Kalle
 Mother Küsters' Trip to Heaven (1975) - Knab
 Death is My Trade (1977) - Sturmbannführer Kellner
 Lola (1981) - Esslin
 A Woman in Flames (1983) - Markus
 Decoder (1984) - H-Burger Manager
 The Noah's Ark Principle (1984) - Felix Kronenberg
 Grottenolm (1985) - Peckert
 Tamboo (1985)
  (1986) - Dr. Herbst
  (1987) - Gonski
 Der Fall Boran (1987) - Zand
 Europa, abends (1989) - Bari / Krüger / Tschug / Kanalarbeiter
 Hard Days, Hard Nights (1989)
 My Lovely Monster (1991)
 Das gemordete Pferd (1991) - Erwin
  (1992)
 Im Himmel hört dich niemand weinen (1993)
  (1993) - Pastor
  (1994) - Carlos
 Die Eroberung der Mitte (1995) - Dr. Konstantin
 Deathmaker (1995) - Dr. Machnik
  (1996) - Günther Stapenhorst
 Hundert Jahre Brecht (1998)
 Planet der Kannibalen (2001) - Dienstag

References

Bibliography 
 Langford, Michelle. Directory of World Cinema: Germany, Volume 10. Intellect Books, 2010.

External links 
 

1939 births
2001 deaths
German male stage actors
German male film actors
German male television actors
Actors from Hanover
20th-century German male actors